The 2013 Rugby League World Cup was the fourteenth staging of the Rugby League World Cup and took place in England, Wales, France and Ireland. between 26 October and 30 November 2013.

It was the main event of the year's Festival of World Cups. Fourteen teams contested the tournament: Australia, England, New Zealand, Samoa, Wales, Fiji, France, Papua New Guinea, Ireland, Scotland, Tonga, Cook Islands, Italy and the United States. The latter two were competing in the Rugby League World Cup for the first time.

New Zealand were the defending champions, having defeated Australia in 2008. Australia won the tournament, beating New Zealand 34–2 in the final to lift the trophy for the tenth time.

In terms of attendance, exposure and revenue, the 2013 tournament is considered the most successful Rugby League World Cup to date.

Organisation

Background 
The Rugby League International Federation confirmed this competition as a part of its international program. The RLIF announced a five-year plan to build up to the 2013 World Cup with Four Nations tournaments held in 2009, 2010 and 2011. The competition was part of the UK's "Golden Decade of Sport".
2013 was chosen as the year of the World Cup to avoid a clash with the London Olympics in 2012. After 2013, the Cup will be held on a quadrennial cycle.

Host selection 
In addition to the United Kingdom, Australia announced its intention to bid for the hosting rights, despite hosting the previous World Cup in 2008. The Australian Rugby League had been preparing a rival bid due to the success of the 2008 event but the business plan presented by the Rugby Football League for the UK to be the host was accepted by the RLIF at a meeting in July 2009. The event formed part of what was being dubbed a 'Golden Decade' in British Sport.

The UK last hosted the World Cup in 2000, with the event generally being considered unsuccessful.

Prince Charles welcomed representatives of all 14 nations and tournament organisers with a reception at Clarence House.

Qualification 

There were two qualifying pools for the remaining two World Cup places; a European and an Atlantic pool, with one side from each to qualify.

The European Qualifying group involved Italy, Lebanon, Russia and Serbia while the Atlantic Qualifying group involved Jamaica, South Africa and the USA. In the Atlantic Qualifiers the United States and Jamaica defeated South Africa in the opening rounds leaving the final match between the two to determine who qualified for the 2013 Rugby League World Cup. United States defeated Jamaica to qualify for their first ever Rugby League World Cup.

Qualifying Pool One (Europe)

Qualifying Pool Two (Atlantic)

Teams 

The competition featured fourteen teams, compared to ten in 2008. Originally around twenty teams were to be involved in qualification, but subsequently the total number of teams involved in the tournament was fixed at nineteen. Twelve nations automatically qualified; the ten nations that contested the previous World Cup, Wales as winners of the 2009 European Nations Cup and the Cook Islands as runners up in the 2009 Pacific Cup.

Match officials 
Rules and officiating panel: Daniel Anderson, Stuart Cummings and David Waite.

 Australia: Ben Cummins, Shayne Hayne, Ashley Klein and Grant Atkins.
 England: Phil Bentham, Richard Silverwood, Ben Thaler; James Child, Joe Cobb, Mark Craven, Robert Hicks, Chris Leatherbarrow, Tony Martin, Tim Roby, Clint Sharrad, George Stokes, Matt Thomason and Warren Turley
 France: Thierry Alibert and Jose Pereira
 New Zealand: Henry Perenara and Jamal Thompson.

Pre-tournament matches 
Before the World Cup it was announced that USA would face France in Toulouse, Scotland would play Papua New Guinea at Featherstone, England would play Italy at Salford, New Zealand would play the Cook Islands in Doncaster and England Knights would play Samoa at Salford.

Venues 
The games were played at various venues in England, Wales, Ireland, and France.

The Millennium Stadium in Cardiff was the host stadium for the opening ceremony and a double header featuring hosts England playing Australia and Wales taking on Italy. The decision to play England vs Australia in Cardiff to open the tournament drew criticism from some in the press who believed that the game should have been played in England where a higher attendance could be expected, or at least a full house which would have looked better than the almost half empty Millennium Stadium.

Headingley in Leeds, the Halliwell Jones Stadium in Warrington, the Racecourse Ground in Wrexham and the DW Stadium in Wigan hosted the quarter-finals. Both semi-finals were hosted at Wembley Stadium, with the final held at Old Trafford.

Match schedule 

The match schedule was announced on 22 March 2012. The Rugby League International Federation announced the kickoff times of the matches, with the opening kickoff to be held on 26 October in Cardiff, at 14:30 local time. The group stage matches will be played at 14:00, 14:30, 16:00, 16:30, 18:00, and 20:00 local time, with knockout stage matches at 13:00, 15:00, and 20:00 local time. The semi-finals will be played at 13:00 and 15:30 local time and the final, on 30 November 2013 at the Old Trafford stadium, at 14:30 local time.

Opening ceremony

The opening ceremony took place at the Millennium Stadium on 26 October. The ceremony saw 550 dancers perform, 500 amateur and 50 professional, including former players Martin Offiah and Gareth Thomas, both of whom are former Strictly Come Dancing contestants. The ceremony also featured live music and a light show. The ceremony preceded the opening matches of England versus Australia, versus Wales and Italy.

Group stage 
The draw, undertaken at the launch of the event in Manchester on 30 November 2010, involved four groups
The first two groups are made up of four teams whilst the other two groups feature three teams each. There will be a quarter-final round made up of the first three teams in the first two groups and the winners of each of the smaller groups. Group play will involve a round robin in the larger groups, and a round robin in the smaller groups with an additional inter-group game for each team so all teams will play three group games.

Group A

Group B

Group C

Group D

Inter-group matches

Knockout stage 

The quarter-finals followed the group stage, with three teams from each of Groups A and B and one team from each of Groups C and D qualifying.

All times listed below are in Greenwich Mean Time (UTC+0) for English and Welsh venues.

Quarter-finals

Semi-finals

Final

Try scorers 
9 tries
 Brett Morris
 Jarryd Hayne

8 tries
 Ryan Hall
 Roger Tuivasa-Sheck

5 tries
 Cooper Cronk
 Antonio Winterstein

4 tries

 Darius Boyd
 Billy Slater
 Bryson Goodwin
 Shaun Johnson
 Manu Vatuvei
 Matty Russell
 Christiaan Roets

3 tries

 Chris Taripo
 Josh Charnley
 Brett Ferres
 Akuila Uate
 Sonny Bill Williams

2 tries

 Greg Bird
 Daly Cherry-Evans
 Andrew Fifita
 Greg Inglis
 Josh Papalii
 Jonathan Thurston
 Dominique Peyroux
 Tom Briscoe
 Sam Burgess
 Sean O'Loughlin
 Kallum Watkins
 Chris Centrone
 Aidan Guerra
 Ray Nasso
 Simon Mannering
 Frank-Paul Nu'uausala
 Dean Whare
 Suaia Matagi
 Ben Roberts
 Pita Godinet
 Alex Hurst
 Ben Hellewell
 Glen Fisiiahi
 Sika Manu
 Willie Manu
 Clint Newton
 Joseph Paulo
 Matt Petersen
 Tui Samoa
 Rhodri Lloyd

1 try

 Michael Jennings
 Luke Lewis
 Josh Morris
 Cameron Smith
 Daniel Fepuleai
 Jonathan Ford
 Isaac John
 Drury Low
 Keith Lulia
 Lulia Lulia
 Brad Takairangi
 George Burgess
 Rob Burrow
 Rangi Chase
 Leroy Cudjoe
 Ben Westwood
 Thomas Bosc
 Vincent Duport
 Morgan Escare
 Aaron Groom
 Kevin Naiqama
 Wes Naiqama
 Semi Radradra
 Vitale Junior Roqica
 Korbin Sims
 Tariq Sims
 Eloni Vunakece
 Damien Blanch
 James Hasson
 Tyrone McCarthy
 Cameron Ciraldo
 Josh Mantellato
 Anthony Minichiello
 Mark Minichiello
 James Tedesco
 Jesse Bromwich
 Greg Eastwood
 Josh Hoffman
 Krisnan Inu
 Isaac Luke
 Frank Pritchard
 Elijah Taylor
 Josiah Abavu
 Dion Aiye
 Wellington Albert
 Nene MacDonald
 Jessie Joe Parker
 Joseph Leilua
 Penani Manumeasili
 Anthony Milford
 Junior Moors
 Sauaso Sue
 Daniel Vidot
 Danny Addy
 Brett Carter
 Luke Douglas
 Ben Fisher
 Kane Linnett
 Brett Phillips
 Daniel Foster
 Konrad Hurrell
 Nafe Seluini
 Jorge Taufua
 Jason Taumalolo
 Peni Terepo
 Bureta Faraimo
 Kristian Freed
 Mark Offerdahl
 Craig Priestley
 Taylor Welch
 Ben Evans
 Elliot Kear
 Lloyd White
 Rob Massam
 Anthony Walker

Attendances 
Seven grounds achieved sell-out crowds, with four setting stadium records. Games held in both Wales and Ireland were watched by the biggest crowds ever for rugby league internationals in those countries. The final was played in front of the largest crowd ever to attend an international rugby league fixture.

Broadcasting 

* The BBC and Premier Sports jointly televised seven live matches with the remaining 21 live matches exclusive to Premier Sports. The jointly live matches were England's Group A matches (BBC One), an inter-group match between Wales and Italy and a quarter-final (both on BBC Two), a semi-final and the final (both on BBC One). The jointly televised quarter-final and semi-final involved England.

References

External links